Christian Karl Standhardinger (born on ) is a Filipino-German professional basketball player for the Barangay Ginebra San Miguel of the Philippine Basketball Association (PBA). He was selected first overall by the San Miguel Beermen in the 2017 PBA draft making him the oldest first overall pick.

Early life
Standhardinger was born on July 4, 1989, in Munich, in then West Germany to a Filipino mother. His mother, Elizabeth Santos Hermoso traces her roots to the town of Angono, Rizal. Growing up in Germany, Standhardinger's maternal grandfather, Boy Hermoso, who played in the Philippines' CYMCA basketball championship in the 1950s introduced him to the sport of basketball.

College career
Standhardinger began his first 2 years of college basketball at Nebraska. During his freshman season, he had to sit out the first 15 games due to NCAA's ruling since he played for a professional team in Germany before heading to the United States for college. He averaged 8.1 points and 3.9 rebounds per game in 16 games as a freshman. During his sophomore year, Standhardinger was suspended by his coach Doc Sadler after playing only 6 games into the season for academic reasons. Standhardinger eventually left the team. He continued his junior and senior years playing for Hawaii.

Professional career

Ehingen Urspring (2006–2009)
He started his professional career in the Erdgas Ehingen/Urspringschule in the ProA of 2. Basketball Bundesliga in 2006. He played for the Urspring until 2009.

2014 NBA draft
Christian Standhardinger went undrafted in the 2014 NBA Draft making him an unrestricted free agent.

Mitteldeutscher BC (2014–2015)
Standhardinger signed a contract with Mitteldeutscher BC of the Basketball Bundesliga (BBL). In his first season, he was selected as a reserve for the BBL All-Star Game.

SC Rasta Vechta (2015–2017)
On 2015, Standhardinger returned to ProA and signed with the SC Rasta Vechta during offseason where he won his first MVP award.

Hong Kong Eastern (2017–2018)
Standhardinger signed a contract with Hong Kong Eastern of the ASEAN Basketball League as their Heritage import. On December 3, 2017, Standhardinger scored 40 points and pulled down 17 rebounds winning over Mono Vampire, 112-105.

San Miguel Beermen (2018–2019)
On October 29, 2017, Standhardinger was selected 1st overall in the 2017 PBA draft by the San Miguel Beermen. He missed the entire 2017–18 PBA Philippine Cup while he played out his contract with the Hong Kong Eastern in the Asean Basketball League. On May 9, 2018, Standhardinger played his first game with the Beermen during their 2018 PBA Commissioner's Cup opener against the Meralco Bolts. San Miguel lost the game 93-85. Standhardinger posted four points, five rebounds, two assists and two steals in his debut.

With his frequent use of brute strength and barreling plays toward the basket, he has been dubbed as "The Bulldozer".

NorthPort Batang Pier (2019–2020) 
On October 14, 2019, Standhardinger was traded to the NorthPort Batang Pier in exchange for Moala Tautuaa.

Barangay Ginebra San Miguel (2021–present) 
On March 5, 2021, Standhardinger was traded to the Barangay Ginebra San Miguel in exchange for Greg Slaughter. On January 5, 2022, Standhardinger signed a three-year contract extension with Barangay Ginebra.

Career statistics

PBA

As of the end of 2021 season

Season-by-season averages

|-
| align=left | 
| align=left | San Miguel
| 27 || 26.8 || .559 || .000 || .657 || 9.3 || 1.5 || .8 || .3 || 16.1
|-
| align=left rowspan=2| 
| align=left | San Miguel
| rowspan=2|58 || rowspan=2|24.8 || rowspan=2|.541 || rowspan=2|.000 || rowspan=2|.639 || rowspan=2|6.9 || rowspan=2|1.4 || rowspan=2|.9 || rowspan=2|.2 || rowspan=2|12.3
|-
| align=left | NorthPort
|-
| align=left | 
| align=left | NorthPort
| 10 || 37.5 || .494 || .333 || .494 || 12.0 || 3.8 || 1.3 || .1 || 19.9
|-
| align=left | 
| align=left | Barangay Ginebra
| 36 || 35.3 || .516 || – || .531 || 9.4 || 2.6 || .7 || .1 || 14.6
|-class=sortbottom
| align="center" colspan=2 | Career
| 131 || 29.1 || .526 || .125 || .593 || 8.5 || 2.0 || .9 || .2 || 14.3

NCAA

|-
| align="left" | 2009–10
| align="left" | Nebraska
| 16 ||  || 15.4 || .409 || .375 || .783 || 3.8 || 0.8 || 0.6 || 0.1 || 8.1
|-
| align="left" | 2010–11
| align="left" | Nebraska
| 6 ||  || 17.7 || .463 || .000 || .760 || 5.5 || 0.7 || 0.2 || 0.2 || 9.5
|-
| align="left" | 2011–12
| align="left" | Hawaii
| 32 ||  || 30.1 || .510 || .333 || .644 || 7.9 || 1.3 || 1.4 || 0.5 || 15.8
|-
| align="left" | 2012–13
| align="left" | Hawaii
| 31 ||  || 31.9 || .474 || .277 || .768 || 8.4 || 1.5 || 1.4 || 0.7 || 18.1
|-
| style="text-align:center;" colspan="2"| Career
| 85 ||  || 27.1 || .482 || .301 || .725 || 7.1 || 1.2 || 1.2 || 0.5 || 14.7

National team career
In 2007, Standhardinger played for the national under-18 team of Germany.

Standhardinger is eligible to play for the Philippines but only as a naturalized player since he acquired his Philippine passport after he became 16 years old. In June 2017, Standhardinger joined the national men's basketball team of the Philippines.  He played with the team at the 2017 William Jones Cup and the 2017 FIBA Asia Cup.

After Andray Blatche pulled out for the 2017 FIBA Asia Cup due to security concerns over the militant situation in the host country Lebanon, Standhardinger replaced him as the Philippine team's naturalized player.

Standhardinger played with the Philippine team at the 2017 Southeast Asian Games in Kuala Lumpur, Malaysia. They won the gold medal after beating Indonesia 94-55, Standhardinger scored 11 points in the gold medal game.

In June 2018, Standhardinger suited up for the Philippines for the FIBA 3x3 World Cup which the country hosted despite a lingering knee injury. They finished the tournament at 11th place.

On August 5, 2018, Standhardinger was selected to be a part of the Philippine team for the 2018 Asian Games played between August 14 to September 1, 2018. They finished the tournament at 5th place.

Weeks after the 2018 Asian Games, Standhardinger suited up for the revamped Philippine team under Coach Yeng Guiao. On September 13, 2018, Standhardinger had 30 points and 12 rebounds against Iran for his FIBA World Cup Asian Qualifiers debut.

References

External links
 
 
 

1989 births
Living people
ASEAN Basketball League players
Asian Games competitors for the Philippines
Basketball players at the 2018 Asian Games
Citizens of the Philippines through descent
Competitors at the 2017 Southeast Asian Games
Competitors at the 2019 Southeast Asian Games
Eastern Sports Club basketball players
Ehingen Urspring players
Filipino expatriate basketball people in Hong Kong
Filipino men's 3x3 basketball players
Filipino men's basketball players
German expatriate basketball people in the United States
German men's basketball players
German sportspeople of Filipino descent
Hawaii Rainbow Warriors basketball players
Mitteldeutscher BC players
Nebraska Cornhuskers men's basketball players
NorthPort Batang Pier players
Philippine Basketball Association All-Stars
Philippines men's national basketball team players
Philippines national 3x3 basketball team players
Power forwards (basketball)
San Miguel Beermen draft picks
San Miguel Beermen players
SC Rasta Vechta players
Southeast Asian Games gold medalists for the Philippines
Southeast Asian Games medalists in basketball
Sportspeople from Munich